Afwa Thameur, in Arabic: عفوا ثامر is a plant biologist and agronomist from Tunisia who specialises in drought tolerance in cereal crops. She holds is a Fellow of the Arab Women Leaders in Agriculture initiative.

Career 
Thameur studied for a PhD in Biology at Tunis El Manar University, graduating in 2012, aged thirty. Her post-doctoral research took place at Szeged University in Hungary. In 2015 Thameur was awarded a Fulbright scholarship to study in the USA. This scholarship enabled her to work at the US Department of Agriculture in Texas and Mississippi. Her research project was entitled 'Enhancement of Bioactive Compound Production in Chinaberry, Melia azadirach, and Monk's Pepper, Vitex agnus castus'. From 2016 to 2019 she worked with Walid Sadok of the University of Minnesota on a partnership programme funded by the International Centre for Biosaline Agriculture (ICBA) and CRDF Global to enhance and stabilise wheat production in Tunisia. In 2019 she joined the first fellowship cohort of the Arab Women Leaders in Agriculture initiative. As of 2020 she was a research scientist at the Ministry of Agriculture (IRESA) and Assistant Professor at the University of Gabes.

References 

Year of birth missing (living people)
Living people
Agronomists
Tunis El Manar University alumni
University of Szeged alumni
Tunisian biologists
Women agronomists
Women in agriculture
Tunisian women